KTTX (106.1 FM, KTEX 106) is a radio station broadcasting a country music format. Licensed to Brenham, Texas, United States, the station serves the College Station area.  The station is currently owned by Tom S. Whitehead, Inc. Studios are located in downtown Brenham, and the transmitter is near Somerville in Burleson County.

Format
Since its inception, KTTX has had a music intensive format. Known for their 12 in a Row, the station promises listeners 40 minutes of uninterrupted country music. KTTX focuses on Texas Country or Red Dirt music, with the tagline Sounds Like Texas (although they play music out of Nashville as well).

Current DJs
Trailboss Troy & Tracey Lawless --Morning Express
Crystal Raye --Country Cafe
Marshall Garrett --Workday Round-Up
JJ The Kid - Nights

Weekends 
Craig Montana
Rip Rolling
Marshall Garrett

Community
KTTX is known for their community support throughout the Brazos Valley. Over the years the station has been involved in many charitable endeavors and makes public service a priority.

References

External links

TTX